Federico Otero is an industrial designer and interactive designer from Latin America

Biography
Born in Lima, Peru, Otero started his career as a designer in his natal city at the Universidad Catolica del Peru. He then moved to the U.S. and continued his studies at Purdue University. After working for several years as a lead designer for Delta Faucet Company and as a freelance designer for Marcus Koepke, he decided to further his education at Domus Academy in Milan earning his master's degree in interactive design.

He gives a new face to design by creating products that update traditional and artisanal techniques, transforming them into unique modern forms. His contributions to design include a wide spectrum that ranges from jewelry, faucets and accessories, bottles, furniture and exhibits, bicycles, kitchen tools and lighting. Most recently, his design talent took him to Switzerland where he was designing watches for Tag Heuer. Currently he is freelancing in diverse design areas. 
Otero has exhibited his work in various fairs worldwide including Salone Satellite 2005 in Milan, Cienporciento Diseño 2005 in Buenos Aires, Expo Diseño 2007 in Bogota, Neocon 2007 in Chicago and Casa COR Lima 2007.
Otero's work has been recognized in the business realm, academia and the press. His work has been featured internationally in magazines including Interni, Vogue and Metropolis.
As a student and professional in design, he has received recognition in the following competitions: NHMA (Nacional Housewares Manufacturing Association) 1999 and 2000, Opus 2003, Owens-Illinois Liquor Bottle Design 2004, Colombian Furniture and Fashion Design 2003 and 2004, Macef 2004, International Bicycle Design 2004, Tag Heuer 2004, and Alternative Amazon Wood Furniture Design 2005.  Recently, Interior Design Magazine honored his design called the Catacaos Ceiling Fixture with the 2007 Best of Year Award for Decorative Lighting.

References

Industrial designers
People from Lima
Living people
Year of birth missing (living people)